The Commonwealth Journal of Local Governance is a journal published by the Commonwealth Local Government Forum and the UTS Centre for Local Government (University of Technology, Sydney). The first issue was published on 29 April 2008. The journal is open access

References

External links 

UTS Centre For Local Government

Local government in Australia
Political science journals